Galter is a surname. Notable people with the surname include:

Irène Galter (born 1931), Italian actress
Lluís Galter (born 1983), Spanish film director and screenwriter
Pietro Galter (1840–1901), Italian painter

See also
Galter Pavilion, a skyscraper in Chicago, Illinois, United States